ezboard, Inc., based in San Francisco, California, United States, was a provider of free and paid hosted Internet forums.

Description
ezboard was a provider of a free hosted message board for use by webmasters and message board administrators who have little to no experience running a web site. Along with having premade ezboard templates and a color picking tool, the ezboard community also supports volunteers who will help other users customize their ezboards.

ezboard offered free and paid accounts for both boards and users. The free accounts were supported through advertisements, and had fewer features in regards to customization and board management. Paid members were called "ezSupporters", while paid message boards were referred to as "Gold boards". Accounts were either local (deprecated) and tied to a specific board, or global, which could be used for posting across the entire ezboard network.

History

ezboard is a web application, created in 1996 by Vanchau Nguyen. One of the earliest user-customisable online message board providers, it quickly grew. Around its peak in 2001, it was in the top 50 most popular websites in the world.  https://web.archive.org/web/20110105083345/http://blog.compete.com/2007/10/01/top-ranked-web-sites-popularity-2001/

In 2001 ezboard launched their first CSC (Community-Supported Communities) product, i.e. a paid version of ezboard without advertisements. This later split into CSC Blue (officially called CSC Community) and CSC Gold (officially called CSC Gold Community). CSC Blue removed intrusive advertising popups but retained advertising banners for a fixed price, while CSC Gold was 100% ad-free with extra features, but at a variable cost. It was reported that some very large ezboards paid the fixed price for CSC Blue, which ultimately proved to be an unprofitable product. ezboard announced that as of August 31, 2001 they would no longer renew CSC Blue boards.

In 2002 ezboard introduced image hosting, which was provided by a third party and not in-house by ezboard. Announcements followed, which showed the image hosting deal to be an unfortunate disaster. Eventually, the parent company filed for bankruptcy, leaving ezboard to continue operation of the image hosting in-house, while developing a new hosting product in parallel. A later announcement highlighted a miscommunication between ezboard staff and moderators with an admission that the image hosting service had been a bad decision.

On October 22, 2002, ezboard version 7.0 was released. This included a number of changes to free boards, which were met with negative comments from free board administrators. 7.0 also included enhanced user profiles, a redesigned web site and a new-look control center.

On December 10, 2002, ezboard version 7.1 was released, which included the ezPost tool. This provided users with fast access to useful posting features, such as changing font sizes and inserting links. However, some admins were unhappy that users could now post in a variety of fonts and colors, thereby altering the look and feel of their boards. This divided feedback was very common on ezboard due to the large number of users.

On March 11, 2003, ezboard version 7.2 was released. This was the last version of the core ezboard product to contain new features for nearly four years. After 7.2, various patches were applied to other areas of the ezboard service, such as spellcheck, free gold, meetup, and network performance and improvements.

In January 2004, a SQL Based back-end created by Jordan Bortz began to be rolled out to all servers.  This upgrade significantly enhanced performance and reliability; issues which had been significantly impacting ezboard previously.

On March 4, 2004, Robert Labatt was appointed as ezboard's new CEO. Vanchau Nguyen later chose to leave ezboard but remained on the Board of Directors. Vanchau left in April 2004 according to his linkedin page.

On March 14, 2005, ezboard 7.32 was released. This is the most recent numbered version to be released to all servers, although patches have been released since then.

On May 31, 2005, ezboard claimed they were hacked, causing many boards to lose information, become inaccessible, or be completely wiped. Ezboard indicated that it was "impossible to restore all data to all boards". Assistance was requested from the FBI and $5,000 offered for "information that leads to the direct arrest and conviction of the hacker".

On February 28, 2007, ezboard staff posted about a new version of ezboard  7.33. Although this was primarily to compile the patches made since version 7.32, several small enhancements were also mentioned - the first to the message boards since version 7.2, released on March 11, 2003. Users did not expect this move as moderators had often stated that ezboard would no longer be updated. On May 1, 2007, these changes were officially announced, although there was no mention of 7.33. Therefore, the latest version of ezboard is still 7.32.

ezboard and Yuku

Yuku was the successor to ezboard. It has been alpha/beta software since it was first unveiled at DEMOfall 2005. On January 9, 2008, it was confirmed that Yuku was "coming out of beta", although a date has not been set.

As of January 8, 2008, it has been confirmed that all ezboard communities would be moving to Yuku. However, board owners can ask for a delay in the migration process.

As of January 15, 2008, the ezboard home page redirects to a Yuku Welcome page. A link allows users to log into ezboard.

ezboard switched all its boards to Yuku.

On September 8, 2011 Yuku was acquired by CrowdGather, Inc. The acquisition included all legacy ezboard domains.

Technology

ezboard was written in Smalltalk VisualWorks 3.1 by Vanchau Nguyen with Jay O'Connor. There was no database used on the back-end, but instead a built-in flat-file object-oriented datastore (BOSS) which together with the overall power of the Smalltalk language made the code fast and compact for the time.

ezboard used a flat file system consisting of binary objects.  It had no relational database.  Attempts were made to migrate the database to a traditional RDBMS but attempts failed because they were too slow.  ezboard was an early form of a NoSQL style database as the objects were essentially JSON type data (key-value pairs).  The flat files were stored in deep nested directory structures

Ezboard's creator, Vanchau Nguyen, said he had "bet his company, and his future, on Cincom Smalltalk". He also mentions ezboard's userbase, listed as having nearly 20 million registered users.

Kep C. Kepler was the 1st CIO and Director Of Technology.

References

External links

Yuku home page

Internet forum hosting
Companies based in San Francisco